Lady with the Light Gloves is a 1942 Danish drama film written and directed by Benjamin Christensen. It was the final film that Christensen directed.

Cast
 Lily Weiding
 Hans-Henrik Krause as Torben
 Tavs Neiiendam
 Paul Rohde
 Karl Jørgensen
 Grete Gravesen
 Jessie Rindom
 Hans Otto Nielsen
 Vagn Kramer
 Holger Strøm
 Olaf Ussing
 Bjarne Henning-Jensen

References

External links
 

1942 films
1942 drama films
Danish drama films
1940s Danish-language films
Danish black-and-white films
Films directed by Benjamin Christensen